Ernest Osborne (12 May 1899–1958) was an English footballer who played in the Football League for Crystal Palace.

References

1890s births
1958 deaths
English footballers
Association football forwards
English Football League players
Crystal Palace F.C. players